DWWW (774 AM) is a C-QUAM radio station owned and operated by Interactive Broadcast Media. The studio is located at Units 807 and 808, Atlanta Centre, Annapolis St., Greenhills, San Juan, Metro Manila, while the transmitter is located at Tagalag Road, Brgy. Tagalag, Valenzuela.
DWWW is an affiliate station of RMN Networks since 2011.

As of Q4 2022, DWWW is the 3rd most-listened to AM radio station in Metro Manila, based on a survey commissioned by Kantar Media Philippines and Kapisanan ng mga Brodkaster ng Pilipinas.

History

1963–1995: DZBM/DWOO/DWAT
The modern DWWW was established in 1963 as DZBM 740 kHz under Mareco Broadcasting Network. A sister station was DZLM/DWOO 1430 kHz, it served as a promotional radio station for music released by Villar Records and Mabuhay Records. In 1978, it later changed its frequency to 774 kHz in response to the adoption of the 9-kHz spacing on AM radio stations in the Philippines. At the same time, it switched to a news & talk format. In 1994, it changed its callsign to DWAT and served as the first station of veteran broadcasters, Fernan Gulapa, Willie Delgado, and the son of the late Louie Beltran, Cito Beltran. It was the home of CNN on AM radio in the Philippines, aside from Citylite 88.3 (now Jam 88.3) and 105.1 Crossover (now as Q Radio 105.1).

1996–2010: DWWW
In 1996, Interactive Broadcast Media, owned by broadcast veteran Roberto Bacsal and businessman Rene Palma, bought the station and changed its callsign to DWWW, which was formerly used by DZMM until 1986. Its studios were moved to #23 E. Rodriguez Sr. Ave. in Quezon City. The station airs oldies, covering music from the 50s to 80s in the afternoon and evening slots, while morning and late afternoon slots were allotted for news and public affairs programs, in both Tagalog and English languages; taking it to the #4 spot in the Mega Manila AM ratings and carved a strong niche against rival stations. Back then, the station operated for 21 hours from Monday to Saturdays, and 20 hours on Sundays.

DWWW also introduced the Broadkast Patrol reportorial team (which was relaunched in 2017) for news. Aside from Gulapa and Beltran, other personalities were part of the station's early years are Lito Villarosa, Jun Taña, Bobby Guanzon, Vic Morales and Joey Collantes. Jun Ricafrente of DZMM served as head of the news service in the 90s.

2011–present: Expansion and Dominance
Under new ownership and management, DWWW was relaunched on November 2, 2011, in its new home in Atlanta Center, Greenhills, San Juan and expanded its broadcast hours to 24/7 on-air broadcast (although its signs off on early morning of Sundays for transmitter maintenance). The station's music library was overhauled and reorganized. The nomenclature of the station's identification changed from "Siete siete cuatro/siyete siyete kwatro" to "Seven seven four." The new tagline "The Music of Your Life" was also launched to highlight the dominant ratings of DWWW's oldies music format programs.

In 2014, the tagline was changed to "Your Ultimate AM Radio" to showcase DWWW's competitive news, commentary, and public service programs, aside from music and entertainment. It is currently the #2 AM Mega Manila station based on the latest Nielsen Surveys, next to leader DZMM.  Such dominance continued to date, thus prompting the team to change the tag to "Your Ultimate Newsic Radio" in mid-2018.

DWWW was relaunched on September 8, 2019, during the Grandparents' Day event at the Farmers Plaza, Araneta Center. The station identification's nomenclature reverted to Tagalog naming "siyete siyete kwatro", though the English naming is still heard only on some plugs prior to this.

References

External links
 

Radio stations in Metro Manila
News and talk radio stations in the Philippines
Oldies radio stations in the Philippines
Radio stations established in 1963